The 22d Aeromedical Evacuation Squadron (22 AES) was a unit of the United States Air Force. It was created in 1957 in South Carolina, and inactivated on 1 July 1970.

History
21st Aeromedical Evacuation Squadron and 22d Aeromedical Evacuation Squadrons were activated under the 1st Aeromedical Evacuation Group of the USAF Tactical Medical Center on 19 March 1957 at Donaldson AFB, South Carolina.

On 30 June 1957, the USAF Tactical Medical Center and subordinate units were assigned to the 464th Troop Carrier Wing and relocated to Pope AFB, North Carolina. The USAF Tactical Medical Center was inactivated on 16 September 1957, while at the same time, the 22d Aeromedical Evacuation Squadron was reassigned to Sewart AFB, Tennessee; it was moved again to Pope AFB, North Carolina in 1968.

On 1 July 1970, the 22d Aeromedical Evacuation Squadrons was inactivated. All personnel and equipment were reassigned to the 1st Aeromedical Evacuation Group.

References

22
Military units and formations in Tennessee